Soledad (Sol, Solly) Ballon Magdaluyo (born March 11, 1940), better known by her screen name Sofia Moran, is a Filipina actress, singer and record artist, credited with over 60 Philippine and foreign films. The Philippine actress began her film career in the Philippines in 1967 shortly after Joseph Estrada, then the country's biggest box-office draw and action star, gave her a first break and introduced her as Sofia Moran in his major film in 1968. She was born as Soledad Ballon in Nabua, Camarines Sur.

Career 
 

 
Sofia was immediately featured in Valiente Brothers, starring Joseph Estrada, Jess Lapid Sr., and Jun Aristorenas, the biggest action stars in the country in 1968, and famously Directed by Augusto Buenaventura.  

Sofia Moran made a remarkable 64 movies between 1967 and 1974 sharing the lead and starring next to the biggest leading male movie stars in the business to include Joseph Estrada, Fernando Poe Jr., Tony Ferrer, Eddie Garcia, Zaldy Zshornack, Vic Vargas and Bernard Bonnin.

Her most memorable films were  Sofia starred in many of the Philippines’ historical movie classics, notably Siete Infantes de Lara (1973) as Princess Gismenia, co-starred with the legendary and award-winning filmmaker, Manuel Conde.

During the 1970s up until her migration to the United States (Las Vegas), Sofia was busy with her Las Vegas-style Live performances in Manila entertainment venues, such as the legendary Victoria Peak, as well as within the islands in the Philippines, Southeast Asia and major cities in Japan (Tokyo, Osaka). 
 
In 1971, Moran co-starred in the cult film Women in Cages with Pam Grier. It was featured in the Planet Terror portion of the 2007 film Grindhouse  directed by Quentin Tarantino. In August 2007, Grindhouse Director Quentin Tarantino said of the film, "I'm a huge, huge fan of Gerry de Leon.... the film Women in Cages is just harsh, harsh, harsh," he said, and described the final shot as one of "devastating despair." Sofia generated critical international reviews from her role as Theresa in Women in Cages  and was nominated as Best Actress in a Supporting Role during the 1971 Metro Manila Film Festival

Sofia Moran became known in the 1970's as one of the major actors starring in films representing both the liberation as well as exploitation of the Philippines Film Industry in scenes with daring and bold scenes such as her films in "Huwag Kang Makiapid" (1971) and "Marupok" (1970), as well as the article by Michael Flores, Bodies of Work in Philippine Cinema.

Filmography

Personal life 

After retiring from film, Moran lived in Las Vegas, Nevada, and Atlantic City, New Jersey, with her husband, Dante A. Magdaluyo. Magdaluyo worked as a casino pit manager at Caesars Atlantic City.

Moran has homes in Nabua, Camarines Sur, Fort Lauderdale, Florida, and Las Vegas, Nevada. Her husband, Dante, died on February 24, 2019, at Santa Maria Josefa Foundation Hospital in Iriga City, Camarines Sur.

Moran is Catholic. She volunteers and supports the work of Holy Cross Catholic Church in Nabua and the Catholic Women's League in Naga City. Every year, she coordinates Nabua's annual Fiesta of Nuestra Senora de Angustia.

Further reading

Quirino, J. (1973). Like Dew in April and Other Stories. Philippines: National Book Store.
Zafra, J. (1995). Twisted. Philippines: Anvil.

References

External links 

 

1945 births
Living people
Filipino film actresses
20th-century Filipino women singers
American people of Filipino descent